Nationality words link to articles with information on the nation's poetry or literature (for instance, Irish or France).

Events

1181:
Bertran de Born's first datable poem, a sirventes

1183:
 Ordering of the Senzai Wakashū, an imperial Japanese poetry anthology
 Bertran de Born composed a planh, "Mon chan fenisc ab dol et ab maltraire", on the death of Henry the Young King. Rigaut de Berbezill composed another, "Si tuit li dol e.l plor e.l marrimen", as did Peire Raimon de Tolosa.

1187:
 Compilation of the Senzai Wakashū, ordered in 1183

Works published

1180:
 Approx. date of Khusraw and Shirin by Nezami

Births
Death years link to the corresponding "[year] in poetry" article. There are conflicting or unreliable sources for the birth years of many people born in this period; where sources conflict, the poet is listed again and the conflict is noted:

1180:
 August 6 - Emperor Go-Toba (died 1239), Japanese Emperor, calligrapher, painter, musician, poet, critic, and editor
 4 September — Raimbaut de Vaqueiras  (died 1207), Provençal troubadour and knight
 Kambar (died 1250), medieval Tamil poet and the author of the Ramavataram
 Peire Cardenal (died 1278), an Occitan troubadour

1181:
 Ibn al-Farid (died 1235), Arabic Sufi poet

1184:
 Ibn al-Farid (died 1235), Arabic Sufi poet
 Sa‘di (died 1283/1291), Persian poet
 Ahmad al-Tifashi (died 1253), Arabic poet, writer, and anthologist, in Tunisia

1186:
 Baha' al-din Zuhair (died 1258), Arabian poet

Deaths
Birth years link to the corresponding "[year] in poetry" article:

1180:
 Minamoto no Yorimasa (born 1106), Japanese poet
 John Tzetzes (born 1110), Byzantine
 Zhu Shuzhen (born 1135), Chinese poet of the Song dynasty

1181:
 Serlo of Wilton (born c.1105), English-born Latin poet and abbot

1183:
 Wace (born 1115), Anglo-Norman poet and author of the Roman de Brut and Roman de Rou

1187:
 November 9 - Emperor Gaozong of the Song Dynasty (born 1107)

1189:
 Anvari (born 1126), Persian

See also

 Poetry
 12th century in poetry
 12th century in literature
 List of years in poetry

Other events:
 Other events of the 12th century
 Other events of the 13th century

12th century:
 12th century in poetry
 12th century in literature

Notes

12th-century poetry
Poetry